Union Street Stores is a shopping complex located in San Francisco, California, designed by architect Beverly Willis in 1963.

Overview
The Union Street Stores is a shopping complex comprising nine retail units and two restaurants that was developed through adaptive reuse restoration of three Victorian residences. The project was designed by architect Beverly Willis in 1963. For her design achievement, Willis was awarded the State of California Governor’s Design Award of Exceptional Distinction and an American Institute of Architects Award of Merit. The project was among the first prototypes of adaptive reuse development as a means to “convert crumbling structures of the past into attractive, functional sites to serve modern business needs.” The decision to rehabilitate, rather than raze, the Victorian structures was prophetic of future revitalization efforts in San Francisco and in the U.S. The project “set the style for regeneration of the Union Street commercial district” and “foreshadowed national efforts to restore old buildings in city centers.”

Design
The completion of the Union Street Stores inspired the formation of a commercial district along a five-block stretch of a deteriorating area in San Francisco that became a popular commercial destination in the city and “charting the course and the ambiance of the well-known shopping and dining mecca we know today.” Along with the historic Ghirardelli Square and The Cannery (a former Del Monte fruit-canning plant) shopping centers, Willis’ design stands among these initial explorations of adaptive reuse as a means of revitalization through historic preservation− a concept that had not yet reached other major urban centers in the United States at that time. The project “ inspired community interest in the possibilities of adaptive reuse, making Union Street a linear Ghirardelli Square.” Revitalization projects in San Francisco, such as Union Street, set a precedent for future adaptive reuse construction including, most famously, Boston’s Faneuil Hall Market Place renovated in 1976, ten years later.

References

Shopping malls established in 1963
Shopping malls in the San Francisco Bay Area